Xyleborinus saxesenii is a species of typical bark beetle in the family Curculionidae. Its common names include fruit-tree pinhole borer, common Eurasian ambrosia beetle, Asian ambrosia beetle, and lesser shot hole borer. It is native to the Palaearctic and has been introduced to North America. X. saxesenii is primarily a temperate zone species, although it does appears in some areas in more tropical climates.

It usually attacks unhealthy trees. It hosts in the ornamental trees, stone fruits and timber. Almost all conifers and hardwoods are susceptible. Economic damage to fruit trees has bas been particularly devastating.

References

Further reading

External links

 

Scolytinae
Beetles of Asia
Beetles of Europe
Beetles described in 1837
Taxa named by Julius Theodor Christian Ratzeburg
Articles created by Qbugbot